The speckled day gecko (Phelsuma guttata) is a diurnal species of geckos. It lives in eastern Madagascar and typically inhabits rainforests and dwells on trees. The speckled day gecko feeds on insects and nectar.

Description
This lizard belongs to the medium-sized day geckos. It can reach a total length of about 13 cm. The body colour of this slender and long-snouted gecko is dark green. There are several small orange spots on the middle and lower portion of the back. A black eye stripe extends from the nostril to above the ear opening. Typical for this species are several v-shaped stripes on the throat. The flanks, legs and toes are white speckled. Some populations have some blue spots in the neck region. The ventral side is grayish white.

Distribution
This species inhabits north-east Madagascar, along the coast. It can also be found on some nearby islets.

Habitat
P. guttata typically lives in rainforests where they live on trees and avoid bright sun light. Since much of the primary rainforest has been cleared, this species is also found on bushes and introduced banana trees.

Diet
These day geckos feed on various insects and other invertebrates. They also like to lick soft, sweet fruit, pollen and nectar.

Behaviour
This Phelsuma species is often found in pairs on a tree. Juveniles mainly inhabit surrounding low shrubs.

Reproduction
The females lay a pair of eggs and hide them on the ground under foliage or wood or they may lay their eggs on trees under loose bark. At a temperature of 28 °C, the young will hatch after approximately 40–45 days. The juveniles measure 45 mm.

Care and maintenance in captivity
These animals should be housed in pairs in a well planted terrarium. The humidity should be maintained between 75. In captivity, these animals can be fed with crickets, wax moths, fruits flies, mealworms and houseflies.

References

Henkel, F.-W., and W. Schmidt (1995) Amphibien und Reptilien Madagaskars, der Maskarenen, Seychellen und Komoren. Stuttgart: Ulmer. 
McKeown, Sean (1993) The general care and maintenance of day geckos. Advanced Vivarium Systems, Lakeside CA.

Phelsuma
Reptiles described in 1922